Henri, Count of Paris, Henri d'Orleans and Henri, Duke of France are all names taken by recent claimants to the French throne.

 Henri, Count of Paris (1908–1999)
 Henri, Count of Paris (1933–2019), his son

See also
 Henri d'Orléans (disambiguation)